Dezesseis de Novembro (Portuguese meaning November 16) is a municipality of the western part of the state of Rio Grande do Sul, Brazil. The population is 2,378 (2020 est.) in an area of 216.85 km².

It produces the most alfalfa crops in Brazil which earns it the nickname the "Alfalfa Capital of Brazil".

Bounding municipalities

Roque Gonzales
São Luiz Gonzaga
São Nicolau
Pirapó

References

External links 
 City website 

Municipalities in Rio Grande do Sul